This article presents a list of the historical events and publications of Australian literature during 1920.

Books 

 J. H. M. Abbott — Castle Vane: A Romance of Bushranging on the Upper Hunter in the Olden Days
 Arthur H. Adams — The Australians: A Novel
 Roy Bridges — The Fenceless Ranges
 Mary Grant Bruce — Dick Lester of Kurrajong
 Bernard Cronin — The Timber Wolves
 Isabel Dick — The Veil of Discretion
 Mary Gaunt — The Surrender and Other Happenings
 Nat Gould
 A Chestnut Champion
 The Silver Star
 The Sweep Winner
 Jack McLaren —  The Savagery of Margaret Nestor: A Tale of Northern Queensland
 Dowell O'Reilly - Five Corners
 Vance Palmer — The Shantykeeper's Daughter
 Arthur J. Rees — The Hand in the Dark
 Lilian Turner — Rachel

Poetry 

 Martin Boyd — Retrospect: Poems
 James Hebblethwaite — The Poems of James Hebblethwaite
 Henry Kendall — The Poems of Henry Kendall
 Hugh McCrae — Columbine
 Dorothea Mackellar — "Dusk in the Domain"
 Furnley Maurice — Ways and Means: a poem and an argument
 Nina Murdoch — "The Camphor Laurel Tree"
 John Shaw Neilson
 "The Eleventh Moon"
 "Ride Him Away"
 Vance Palmer
 The Camp
 "Europe"
 "The Farmer Remembers the Somme"
 "These Are My People"
 Roderic Quinn — Poems
 Kenneth Slessor — "In Tyrrell's Bookshop"

Short stories 

 Edward Dyson — "A Terrible Bad Man"
 Henry Lawson — "Asking Dad"
 Dowell O'Reilly — "Crows"

Children's and young adult fiction 

 May Gibbs — Little Ragged Blossom: And More About Snugglepot and Cuddlepie
 Ethel Turner — Laughing Water

Drama 

 Ernest Favenc — Dead Timber and Other Plays

Births 

A list, ordered by date of birth (and, if the date is either unspecified or repeated, ordered alphabetically by surname) of births in 1920 of Australian literary figures, authors of written works or literature-related individuals follows, including year of death.

 8 June — Gwen Harwood, poet (died 1995) 
 18 June — Rosemary Dobson, poet (died (2012)
 3 August — Max Fatchen, writer for children (died 2012)
 3 November — Oodgeroo Noonuccal, poet and activist (died 1993)
 16 November — Colin Thiele, writer for children (died 2006)

Deaths 
A list, ordered by date of death (and, if the date is either unspecified or repeated, ordered alphabetically by surname) of deaths in 1920 of Australian literary figures, authors of written works or literature-related individuals follows, including year of birth.

 12 August — Louisa Lawson, poet (born 1848)

See also 
 1920 in poetry
 List of years in literature
 List of years in Australian literature
 1920 in literature
 1919 in Australian literature
 1920 in Australia
 1921 in Australian literature

References

Literature
Australian literature by year
20th-century Australian literature